The Château de Cropières is an historic castle in Raulhac, Cantal, Auvergne, France.

History
The castle was built in the 13th century.

Architectural significance
It has been listed as an official historical monument by the French Ministry of Culture since 1986.

References

Châteaux in Cantal
Monuments historiques of Auvergne-Rhône-Alpes
Buildings and structures completed in the 13th century